The 2021 Mercan'Tour Classic Alpes-Maritimes was the inaugural edition of the Mercan'Tour Classic Alpes-Maritimes road cycling one day race, which took place in the titular department in southeastern France on 24 May 2021. It was rated as a category 1.1 race on the 2021 UCI Europe Tour.

Teams 
Four UCI WorldTeams, seven UCI ProTeams, and five UCI Continental teams made up the sixteen teams that participated in the race. Teams could enter up to seven riders each, but many decided not to do so. Five teams (and ) fielded only six riders each, and three other teams (and ) fielded only five each, while the remaining eight fielded the maximum number allowed. Of the 100 riders to start the race, only 47 riders finished, with a further three finishing over the time limit.

UCI WorldTeams

 
 
 
 

UCI ProTeams

 
 
 
 
 
 
 

UCI Continental Teams

Result

References

External links 
 

Mercan'Tour Classic Alpes-Maritimes
Mercan'Tour Classic Alpes-Maritimes
Mercan'Tour Classic Alpes-Maritimes